Mario De Grassi (Monfalcone, July 17, 1937) is a former Italian footballer who played as a midfielder.

Career
De Grassi played in Serie A with Triestina.

External links
 Mario De Gassi at Sharkscores.com

Serie A players
U.S. Triestina Calcio 1918 players
Potenza S.C. players
Association football midfielders
Italian footballers

1937 births
Living people